Bineta Diedhiou (born 8 January 1986) is a Senegalese Taekwondo practitioner. She won the bronze medal in featherweight (- 59 kg) at the 2005 World Taekwondo Championships in Madrid. Diedhiou carried Senegal's flag at the 2008 Summer Olympics Opening Ceremony.

References
 Profile

1986 births
Living people
Senegalese female taekwondo practitioners
Taekwondo practitioners at the 2008 Summer Olympics
Taekwondo practitioners at the 2012 Summer Olympics
Olympic taekwondo practitioners of Senegal
African Games gold medalists for Senegal
African Games medalists in taekwondo
African Games silver medalists for Senegal
Competitors at the 2011 All-Africa Games
Competitors at the 2015 African Games
World Taekwondo Championships medalists
African Taekwondo Championships medalists
20th-century Senegalese people
21st-century Senegalese people
Competitors at the 2007 Summer Universiade